The first inauguration of Andrew Jackson as the seventh president of the United States was held on Wednesday, March 4, 1829, at the United States Capitol in Washington, D.C.. The inauguration marked the commencement of the first four-year term of Andrew Jackson as president and the second term of John C. Calhoun as vice president. Chief Justice John Marshall administered the presidential oath of office. Calhoun resigned  into this term, and the office remained vacant for the balance of it. (Before ratification of the Twenty-fifth Amendment in 1967, no constitutional provision existed for filling an intra-term vacancy in the vice presidency.)

Travel
Jackson's three-week journey from Nashville, Tennessee, to Washington, D.C., first by steamboat to Pittsburgh, Pennsylvania, and then onward by carriage, was marked by large crowds greeting the president-elect.

Inauguration

The inauguration itself took place on March 4, 1829, and was the first time in which the ceremony was held on the East Portico of the United States Capitol. Ten thousand people arrived in town for the ceremony, eliciting this response from Francis Scott Key: "It is beautiful; it is sublime!"

By 10:00 am, the area in front of the Capitol was filled with people, and the stairs on the East Portico were blocked by a ship's cable to prevent the crowd from advancing. An excited crowd of roughly 21,000 came to see the swearing-in, even if most would not be able to hear the inaugural address.  Jackson came on foot to the ceremony, but to avoid the multitude, he  used a basement door on the west front to enter the Capitol; upon exiting to face the crowd, he bowed to great cheers.

The scene was described by a witness:

As he had entered, Jackson left on the west front of the Capitol, for the crowd had broken the ship's cable and surged forward.  He proceeded to mount a white horse and rode up Pennsylvania Avenue to the White House.
While this happened people were climbing in through the windows to get into the White House.

The White House was opened to all for a post-inaugural reception and was filled by the public even before Jackson arrived on horseback.  Soon afterward, Jackson left by a window or a side entrance, and proceeded to Gadsby's, later called the National Hotel. The crowd continued to descend into a drunken mob, only dispersed when bowls of liquor and punch were placed on the front lawn of the White House. "I never saw such a mixture," said Joseph Story, then a justice of the Supreme Court: "The reign of King Mob seemed triumphant." The White House was left a mess, including several thousand dollars worth of broken china.

That night an official inaugural ball for administration officials and Washington's high society was held in Carusi's Assembly Rooms, and it set the stage for the scandal that would become known as the Eaton affair. Twelve hundred guests were present, but President Jackson, fatigued and still mourning the loss of his wife Rachel Jackson that December, was not. Another ball was held in the Central Masonic Hall.

 
However, to be fair, two historians, David and Jeanne Heidler, wrote in 2004 about other contemporary accounts that play down the drunken-brawl aspects of the open house. The Heidlers point out that Hamilton, the Jackson supporter from South Carolina, called the damage from the event "trivial." The crowd at the White House was mixed. The first arrivals were the people who made up Washington society. The second crowd that showed up at the mansion was made up of Jackson supporters who were dressed in their best clothes. What happened next doesn't seem to be disputed: The White House wasn't prepared for the crowd as it pressed in through the front door and sought out Jackson, along with the food and whiskey-laced punch. Jackson found himself pressed into a situation with his back to a wall until his people were able to get him away from the crowd, and back to his hotel. The sheer number of people inside the White House led to collisions with furniture and food. After Jackson left, the Heidlers say Antoine Michel Giusta, the White House steward, moved the party outside by taking the punch outside. Other reports indicated that staffers passed punch and ice cream through the White House's windows to the crowd outside. As for the image of a riot of drunken Jackson supporters, the Heidlers believed that the incident was used as a metaphor by Washington society and Jackson's enemies, who feared the new regime and its lower-class roots.

"Most witnesses, however, mentioned little real damage, and newspapers reported only incidental break-age. Niles' Weekly Register, in fact, merely observed that Jackson had 'received the salutations of a vast number of persons, who came to congratulate him upon his induction to the presidency'," said the Heidlers. The story about the cheese happened at the end of Jackson's eight years in office. The president was given a 1,400-pound cheese wheel as a gift, and it sat in the White House for several years. Finally, Jackson allowed the public into the East Room to eat the cheese, which it consumed over several days in 1837. The odors lingered for days after the event.

See also
Presidency of Andrew Jackson
Second inauguration of Andrew Jackson
1828 United States presidential election
Andrew Jackson

References

External links
More documents from the Library of Congress
Text of Jackson's First Inaugural Address

United States presidential inaugurations
Presidency of Andrew Jackson
1829 in Washington, D.C.
1829 in American politics
March 1829 events